Montsaye Academy is a coeducational secondary school and sixth form located in Rothwell, England. As an academy it was granted dual specialty status in late 2004, adding Humanities to its well established Language College status. Meena Gabbi is the current principal. The school received a good review from OFSTED in January 2019. Montsaye is also the site of the developed Rothwell Swimming Pool, which now incorporates a modern sports centre used by the community as well as the school.

The pupils who attend the school are aged 11–18 (year 7–13) and come mainly from Desborough and Rothwell, as well as surrounding villages. The school had around 1274 students and around 100 members of staff as of 2009.

History
Initially, the school was opened in 1955, but the older buildings have been extensively remodelled and developed. Since becoming a comprehensive school in 1976, Montsaye has more than doubled in size and has had a series of major building extensions.

In 2004/05, extensive building work took place which has provided additional teaching areas for Mathematics and Science, an I.C.T suite, refurbished administrative accommodation and a visitor reception area. In addition, the sixth form area was remodelled in order to provide a purpose built educational support centre, new laboratories and an extension to the library to provide study facilities and a resource base. More recently, a major project funded by the Big Lottery has provided the college and community with a sports facility consisting of four badminton courts, a sports hall and a refurbished swimming pool. In 2011 a new block costing £6 million was constructed to the north of the school to cater for engineering diploma students. However, it was not possible to be used for this purpose and is now the sixth form centre, as well as containing a gym for school and public use. The original sixth form location has now been converted into an extra music classroom and a new canteen.

The college was granted Language College status in September 2000 and in addition, in September 2004, was also granted Humanities College status as a second specialism. In 2007, the school was granted a  Vocational College Status as its third status. In 2009, the main school website went under construction and has now changed. The new and improved website provides a more clear, structured mass of information including virtual tours of some classrooms.

On 1 August 2011 the college was converted to an academy. Prior to this conversion, the school was known as "Montsaye Community College".

References

External links

Academies in North Northamptonshire
Secondary schools in North Northamptonshire
Rothwell, Northamptonshire
Educational institutions established in 1955
1955 establishments in England